The Metropolitan Borough of Chelsea was a metropolitan borough of the County of London between 1900 and 1965. It was created by the London Government Act 1899 from most of the ancient parish of Chelsea.  It was amalgamated in 1965 under the London Government Act 1963, with the Royal Borough of Kensington to form the Royal Borough of Kensington and Chelsea.

Ecclesiastical parish 
The ancient parish, was originally dedicated to All Saints, but by the late 17th century it had been rededicated to St Luke. It was in the Diocese of London. In 1824 a new parish church was built in the centre of the parish, it was also dedicated to St Luke and the original parish church became a chapel-at-ease known as All Saints, Chelsea or Chelsea Old Church. From 1831, as the population of Chelsea increased, a number of new parishes were formed:
 Holy Trinity, Upper Chelsea in 1831
 St Saviour, Upper Chelsea in 1840
 St Jude, Upper Chelsea in 1844, (merged into Holy Trinity, Upper Chelsea in 1892)
 All Saints, Chelsea (Chelsea Old Church) voluntarily took care of certain streets from 1855, became a separate parish in 1951
 Park Chapel, Chelsea Park in c.1855, (renamed Emmanuel, Chelsea Park in 1906; then St Andrew, Chelsea Park in 1912)
 St Simon Zelotes, Upper Chelsea in 1859
 Christ Church, Chelsea in 1860
 St John, Chelsea World's End in 1877

In the detached part of Chelsea parish, around the hamlet of Kensal Green (Kensal Town), a number of new parishes were also formed:
 St John the Evangelist, Kensal Green in 1845 with parts of Kensington, Paddington, Hammersmith and Willesden
 St Luke the Evangelist, Kensal Green in 1877 with parts of Holy Trinity, Kilburn 
 St Jude, Kensal Green in 1879

Population and area
The population recorded in the Census was:

Chelsea Vestry 1801–1899

Metropolitan Borough 1900–1961
{| class="wikitable" 
! Year
|| 1901|| 1911 || 1921 || 1931 || 1941 ||1951 || 1961 
|-
! Population || 73,842 || 66,385 || 63,697 || 59,031 ||<ref>The census was suspended for World War II</ref> || 50,957 || 47,256
|}

Coat of arms
The borough was granted a coat of arms by the College of Arms on 28 February 1903. The blazon was:Gules within a cross voided or a crozier in pale of the last in the first quarter a winged bull statant in the second a lion rampant reguardant both argent in the third a sword point downwards proper pomel and hilt gold between two boars' heads couped at the neck of the third and in the fourth a stag's head caboshed of the second.The winged bull is the symbol of St Luke, patron saint of Chelsea (St Luke's parish church is just off the King's Road). The other emblems referred to various holders of the manor over the centuries: the crozier for Westminster Abbey, the lion for Earl Cadogan (first mayor of the borough), the boars' heads and sword for the Sloane family and the stag's head for the Stanley family.

The motto was Nisi dominus frustra'' or "It is vain without the Lord".

The fourfold division of the shield was a design favoured by Albert Woods, Garter King of Arms for municipal grants: other examples in London being the metropolitan boroughs of Bermondsey, Camberwell, Islington, Kensington, Southwark

Politics

Under the Metropolis Management Act 1855 any parish that exceeded 2,000 ratepayers was to be divided into wards; as such the incorporated vestry of St Luke Chelsea was divided into four wards (electing vestrymen): No. 1 or Stanley (9), No. 2 or Church (18), No. 3 or Hans Town (21) and No. 4 or Royal Hospital (12).

In 1894 as its population had increased the incorporated vestry was re-divided into five wards (electing vestrymen): Stanley (12), Church & Cheyne (15), Hans Town (12), Royal Hospital (9) and Kensal Town (12).

The metropolitan borough was also divided into five wards for elections: Cheyne, Church, Hans Town, Royal Hospital and Stanley.

Borough council
The borough council was controlled by the Municipal Reform Party, which was allied to the Conservative Party, from its creation until 1949. In that year, the "Municipal Reform" label was discarded, and the Conservative party governed the borough until the borough's abolition in 1965. Chelsea Town Hall, a neo-classical building containing frescos, remains in use. It is situated on King's Road, at the corner of Chelsea Manor Street.

Parliament constituency
For elections to parliament, the borough formed a single constituency. By 1950, the decline in population meant that the Chelsea constituency also included the Brompton area of the Metropolitan Borough of Kensington.

References

Further reading

External links
A Vision of Britain

Metropolitan boroughs of the County of London
History of the Royal Borough of Kensington and Chelsea
Parishes governed by vestries (Metropolis)
1900 establishments in England
1965 disestablishments in England
Districts abolished by the London Government Act 1963
Metropolitan Borough of